Claudine Dauphin   (b. 1950) is a French archaeologist specialising in the Byzantine period. She is an Honorary Professor at the University of Wales, Lampeter.

Career
Dauphin was a Research Fellow in Byzantine Art and Architecture at Somerville College, Oxford, from 1979 to 1983. She was appointed an Honorary Professor in Archaeology and Theology at the University of Nice. In 2011 she left Nice to join the 'Orient et Mediteranée' group at the CNRS. In 2005 she was appointed an Honorary Professor at University of Wales, Lampeter. She was elected as a Fellow of the Society of Antiquaries of London on 2 February 2007.

Select publications
Dauphin, C. 1998. La Palestine byzantine: peuplement et populations, Volume 1 (BAR International 726). Oxford, ArchaeoPress
Dauphin, C. 1999. "Plenty of just enough? The diet of the rural and urban masses of Byzantine Palestine", Bulletin of the Anglo-Israel Archaeological Society 17, 39–65.
Dauphin, C. 2005. "Sainte-Anne de Jérusalem: le projet Béthesda", Proche-Orient chrétien 55(3/4), 254–262.
Dauphin, C. 2007. "Sex and ladders in the monastic desert of late Antique Egypt and Palestine", Bulletin of the Anglo-Israel Archaeological Society 25. 
Dauphin, C. 2009. Eucharistic bread or thistles?: fact or fiction?; the diet of the desert fathers in late antique Egypt and Palestine. Lampeter, 	Lampeter Trivium Publications (University of Wales).

References

20th-century French historians
21st-century French historians
Alumni of the University of Edinburgh
Academics of the University of Edinburgh
Academics of the University of Oxford
Fellows of the Society of Antiquaries of London
Living people
1950 births
French Byzantinists
French archaeologists
French women archaeologists
Women classical scholars
Fellows of Somerville College, Oxford
20th-century French women
21st-century French women